Lake Seminole Park is a 250-acre municipal park located on the shores of Lake Seminole in Pinellas County, Florida, and serves as a designated wildlife sanctuary. It is home to biking and walking trails, which include a main two-mile-long paved trail, with a 1-mile cutoff option. There are multiple small paths that are about half a mile long that go around a pond and a playground.

Wildlife 
The park's wildlife consists of alligators, bald eagles, black vultures, roseate spoonbills, osprey, tiger swallowtail, pickerelweed, river otters, and green tree frogs.

Amenities 
Lake Seminole Park offers 13 picnic shelters that can be reserved online, a ball field and two playgrounds. Since there is a boat ramp people are able to go fishing in the lakes. The most important fishing species in the lakes are bass, crappie, bream, shellcraker, catfish, gar, and carp. 

There is a recycling collection unit in the park, which is location 29, in Pinellas County.

The park is also designed for people with wheelchairs, by making the park wheelchair accessible.

Gallery

References

Parks in Pinellas County, Florida